The 1982–83 Michigan State Spartans men's basketball team represented Michigan State University in the 1982–83 NCAA Division I men's basketball season. The team played their home games at Jenison Field House in East Lansing, Michigan and were members of the Big Ten Conference. They were coached by Jud Heathcote in his seventh year at Michigan State. The Spartans finished with a record of 17–13, 9–9 to finish in a tie for sixth place in Big Ten play. The Spartans received an invitation to the National Invitation Tournament where they defeated Bowling Green State before losing to Fresno State.

Previous season
The Spartans finished the 1981–82 season with a record of 11–17, 6–12 to finish in a tie for seventh place.

Roster and statistics 

Source

Schedule and results

|-
!colspan=9 style=| Non-conference regular season

|-
!colspan=9 style=|Big Ten regular season

|-
!colspan=9 style=|NIT

References

Michigan State Spartans men's basketball seasons
Michigan State
Michigan State Spartans men's b
Michigan